Cold Feet is a 1989 comedy film directed by Robert Dornhelm. It stars Keith Carradine, Tom Waits, Bill Pullman, Sally Kirkland & Rip Torn.

Plot
Kenny, a psychotic killer with mommy issues, Monte, a charming crooked cowboy, and Maureen, Monte's beautiful oversexed wife-to-be, steal some jewels and smuggle them across the border surgically implanted inside a horse. Monte turns out to be not a sharing or marrying type of person. He saddles up, steals the horse and the jewels, and heads for his brother's ranch in Montana, where his brother and sister-in-law do not fully trust him. When Kenny and Maureen realize what Monte has done with the horse and jewels they set off in hot pursuit of him.

Cast
Keith Carradine as Monte Latham
Sally Kirkland as Maureen
Tom Waits as Kenny
Bill Pullman as Buck Latham
Kathleen York as Laura
Rip Torn as Sheriff
Jeff Bridges as Bartender
Macon McCalman as store owner

Release
Cold Feet was released in theatres on May 19, 1989.

References

External links

1989 films
Films directed by Robert Dornhelm
1980s crime comedy films
American crime comedy films
1989 comedy films
1980s English-language films
1980s American films